Taqrachullu, Pukara Taqrachullu, T'akrachullu, Pukara T'akrachullu (Quechua t'akra uncultivated land, an infertile or rocky piece of land,  chullu spur of land which ends in the confluence of two rivers / something soaked) or María Fortaleza is an archaeological site in Peru. It is located in the Cusco Region, Espinar Province, Suykutambo District.

The site was declared a National Cultural Heritage (Patrimonio Cultural) of Peru.

See also 
 Mawk'allaqta

References 

 mapcarta.com "Ruinas Maria Fortaleza", retrieved on January 29, 2014

Archaeological sites in Peru
Archaeological sites in Cusco Region